Manley as a surname may refer to:

Abe Manley (1885–1952), American Negro league baseball owner
Alexandra, Countess of Frederiksborg (born Alexandra Christina Manley in 1964), former wife of Prince Joachim of Denmark 
Alvin Manley (born 1971), American boxer and two-time National Golden Gloves Super Heavyweight Champion
Alyssa Manley (born 1994), American field hockey player
Andrew Manley, American football quarterback
Audrey F. Manley (born 1934), American pediatrician, acting Surgeon General of the United States from 1995 to 1997 and President of Spelman College
Brian Manley (1929–2014), UK physicist and engineer
Charlotte Manley (born 1957), former Royal Navy officer, now Chapter Clerk of St George's Chapel, Windsor
 David Manley (philosopher), American philosopher
 David Manley (artist), British artist, educationalist and arts administrator
Delarivier Manley (1663 or c.1670–1724), English author, playwright and political pamphleteer
Dex Manley, American commercial and video game voice actor
Dexter Manley (born 1959), former American football player
Don Manley (born 1945), British crossword compiler
Dorothy Manley (1927–2021), British sprinter and Olympic silver medalist in the 100 metres
Douglas Manley (died 2013), Jamaican politician
Edna Manley (1900–1987), Jamaican sculptor
Effa Manley (1897–1981), American Negro league baseball owner and first woman inducted into the Baseball Hall of Fame; wife of Abe Manley
Elizabeth Manley (born 1965), Canadian figure skater and Olympic and world silver medalist
George Manley (born 1965), American voice artist, novelist and screenplay writer
Ger Manley (born 1968), Irish former hurler
Gordon Manley (1902–1980), English climatologist 
Graham Manley (born 1946), British comic artist
James Manley (disambiguation)
Jessica Manley (born 1985), British actress
Jim Manley (disambiguation)
Joe Manley (born 1959), American boxer
Joey Manley, American web comic publisher
John Manley (disambiguation)
Joseph Homan Manley (1842–1905), American politician
Kerrie Manley (born 1982), English footballer
Leon Manley (1926–2010), American football player and coach
Malcolm Manley (born 1949), Scottish footballer
Marion Manley (1893–1984), American architect
Martin Manley (born 1952), former US Assistant Secretary of Labor, entrepreneur and founder of online bookseller Alibris
Martin Manley (1953–2013), American sports writer and statistician
Michael Manley (1924–1997), fourth Prime Minister of Jamaica
Mike Manley (disambiguation)
Natalie Manley, elected to the Illinois House of Representatives in 2012
Norman Manley (1893–1969), Jamaican lawyer, politician and Chief Minister of Jamaica
Peter Manley (born 1962), former professional darts player
Peter Manley (politician) (1903–1998), Canadian politician
Phillipkeith Manley (born 1990), American football player
Rachel Manley, Jamaican writer
Ray Manley (1921–2006), American photographer
R.O.B. Manley (1888–1978), British beekeeper
Roddy Manley (born 1965), Scottish former football player
Scott Manley (born 1972), Scottish YouTube personality, gamer, programmer, astrophysicist and DJ.
Seon Manley (1921–2009), American editor
Simon Manley (born 1967), British diplomat
Stephen Manley (born 1965), American film and television actor 
Stuart Manley (born 1979), Welsh professional golfer
Suliana Manley (born 1975), American biophysicist
Tadhg Manley (1893–1976), Irish politician
Tom Manley (disambiguation)
William Manley (1831–1901), Irish recipient of the Victoria Cross and Surgeon-General

English toponymic surnames